Mahir Hassan (Kurdish: ماهیر حەسەن,Mahîr Hassan; born on January 10, 1963) is a Kurdish actor and playwright, known for the film Star Rebellion.

Early life

He completed his primary, secondary and high school education in Sulaymaniyah, visited his father on several occasions with his father, later settled in Sulaymaniyah, then completed his secondary education and began his artistic career in the 4th year, when he went to the fine arts Institute in Sulaymaniyah. He graduated from the Theater Department and was awarded the Best Actor Award in the same year.

Career

He participated in more than 4 art productions, including the first production of the play JJ (the working-class eye of the workers at the hands of Agha and Darabagh). His best-known products include Star Rebellion, Humor, Patriot, Famous House, Black Luck, Fantalos, and Kashkol.

References 

1963 births
Living people
Kurdish male actors
21st-century dramatists and playwrights
People from Sulaymaniyah